is a Japanese figure skating coach and former competitor.

Hamada graduated from Doshisha University in 1983. She currently coaches at the Kansai University Skating Club in Takatsuki, Osaka with Yamato Tamura.

Her current students include:
Ayaka Hosoda, 8th at 2019 Japanese Nationals
Vincent Zhou, 2017 World Junior Champion and 2019 World bronze medalist
Young You, 2020 Four Continents silver medalist, 4-time South Korean National champion (2015, 18–20) and 2019 Skate Canada Bronze medalist. 
Yuto Kishina, JGP Lithuania and 2020 Bavarian Open bronze medalist
Lucas Tsuyoshi Honda, 2021 CS Cup of Austria silver medalist, 2020 NHK Trophy bronze medalist and 2020–21 Japan junior national champion
Hana Yoshida, 2022 Junior Grand Prix Courchevel gold medalist, 2019-20 Japan junior national bronze medalist, 2020–21 Japan junior national silver medalist, and Bavarian Open junior champion
Mao Shimada, two-time Japanese Junior National Champion (2022, 2023) champion, 2022–23 Junior Grand Prix Final champion and 2022 Egna Trophy advanced novice champion
Ayumi Shibayama, 2022 Junior Grand Prix Courchevel silver medalist
Haruna Murakami / Sumitada Moriguchi, 2023 Japanese Junior champions
Rika Kihira, two-time Four Continents champion and 2018-19 Grand Prix Final gold medalist

Her former students include:
 Yuna Shiraiwa, 2015–16 Japanese Junior and 2016–17 Japanese Junior silver medalist
 Satoko Miyahara (from the age of seven), 2015 World silver medalist and 2018 World bronze medalist and 4-time Japanese National champion (2014-2017) and 2016 Four Continents gold medalist
 Mariko Kihara
 Aki Sawada, 2005 ISU Junior Grand Prix Final silver medalist
 Akiko Kitamura
 Taichi Honda
 Marin Honda, 2016 Junior World Champion, 2017 Junior Silver Medalist, and 2015–16 Junior JGP Final bronze medalist
 Riona Kato
 Kana Muramoto (as a singles skater)
 Satsuki Muramoto
 Yukina Ōta, 2003 World Junior Champion
Sara Honda
Mana Kawabe, 2019–20 Japanese Junior gold medalist

Hamada is a member of the Japan Figure Skating Instructor Association. Based in Kyoto until her rink closed in 2005, she now coaches at Kansai University in Takatsuki, Osaka.

References 

1959 births
Japanese figure skating coaches
Living people
Sportspeople from Kyoto
Female sports coaches